Planman is a surname. Notable people with the surname include:

 Sveta Planman (born 1979), Finnish fashion designer and entrepreneur
 Tuomas Planman (born 1980), Finnish musician